The Philadelphia and Reading Railroad, Bridge at West Falls is a stone and iron plate girder bridge in Philadelphia, Pennsylvania that carries two CSX Trenton Subdivision tracks over Kelly Drive, Schuylkill River, and Martin Luther King Jr. Drive (formerly West River Drive).

It was built in 1890 by the Reading Railroad, and forms a "Y" junction with the adjacent Philadelphia and Reading Railroad, Schuylkill River Viaduct (1854). The bridge consists of an  stone arch over Kelly Drive and eight plate-girder spans that follow a 6-degree curve.

See also
List of bridges documented by the Historic American Engineering Record in Pennsylvania
List of crossings of the Schuylkill River

External links

Bridges completed in 1890
Bridges in Philadelphia
CSX Transportation bridges
Railroad bridges in Pennsylvania
Reading Railroad bridges
Bridges over the Schuylkill River
Historic American Engineering Record in Philadelphia
Iron bridges in the United States
Plate girder bridges in the United States
Stone arch bridges in the United States